The 7th Edda Awards were held on 13 November 2005 at Nordica Hótel in Reykjavík. The Awards were hosted by actor Þorsteinn Guðmundsson and was broadcast live on RÚV.

As in previous years, the public was able to cast their votes online. The Icelandic Film and Television Academy had 70% say in the results and the public 30%. Except for the Best Television Personality where the public had 100% say in the results. This year a total of 53 people were nominated for Best Television Personality.  This year also marked the first time the members of the academy were able to submit their votes online. This was done through a special email service.

The film Voksne Mennesker, directed by Dagur Kári was nominated in five categories and won 4 awards. Magnús Scheving's LazyTown was also nominated in 5 categories but only won one award. Silvía Night was prominent as always and did not shy away from the attention on the award night. She was nominated in two categories and won both. One of those awards was the Best Television Personality which was chosen online by the Icelandic public.

New Categories 
 Landsbankinn Motivation Award

Results 
The nominees and winners were: (Winners highlighted in bold)

Best Film
 One Point O, directed by Marteinn Þórsson & Jeff Renfroe
 Strákarnir okkar, directed by Róbert Ingi Douglas
 Voksne Mennesker, directed by Dagur Kári Pétursson
Best Director
 Ólafur Jóhannesson,  for Africa United
 Dagur Kári Pétursson, for Voksne Mennesker
 Marteinn Þórsson & Jeff Renfroe,  for One Point O
Best Actor/Actress
 Björn Hlynur Haraldsson, for Reykjavíkurnætur
 Guðlaug Elísabet Ólafsdóttir, for Stelpurnar
 Ilmur Kristjánsdóttir, for Stelpurnar
 Nicolas Bro, for Voksne Mennesker
 Þórunn Clausen, for Reykjavíkurnætur
Best Supporting Actor/Actress
 Helgi Björnsson, for Strákarnir okkar
 Jón Atli Jónasson, for Strákarnir okkar
 Pálmi Gestsson, for Áramótaskaupið
 Víkingur Kristjánsson, for Reykjavíkurnætur
 Þorsteinn Bachmann, for Strákarnir okkar
Best Screenplay
 Ólafur Jóhannesson, for Africa United
 Dagur Kári Pétursson & Rune Schjott, for Voksne Mennesker
 Mark Velenti & Magnús Scheving, for LazyTown
Best Documentary
 Rithöfundur með myndavél
 Ragnar í Smára
 Africa United
 Undir stjörnuhimni
 Gargandi snilld
Best Short
 Töframaðurinn
 Þröng sýn
 Ég missti næstum vitið
Best Editing or Cinematography
 Bergsteinn Björgúlfsson, for cinematography in Gargandi Snilld
 Sveinn M. Sveinsson & Ragnar Axelsson, for cinematography in 
 Tómas Örn Tómasson, for cinematography in LazyTown
Best Visual Design
 Eggert Ketilsson, for set design in One Point O
 Magnús Scheving & Guðmundur Þór Kárason, for puppeteering in LazyTown
 María Ólafsdóttir & Guðrún Lárusdóttir for costuming in LazyTown
Best Sound & Music
 Bradley L. North, Byron Wilson, Ann Scibelli, for sound in One Point O
 Slow Slow, for music in Voksne Mennesker
 Hallur Ingólfsson, for music in Töframaðurinn
Best Television Program (staged)
 LazyTown
 Stelpurnar
 Danskeppnin
Best Entertainment in Television
 Idol – Stjörnuleit II (Idol Starsearch)
 Sjáumst með Silvíu Nótt
 Það var lagið
Best Television Program
 Fólk með Sirrý
 Í brennidepli
 Sjálfstætt fólk
 Einu sinni var…
 Útlínur
Best Music Video
 Leaves - Whatever, directed by Gísli Darri Halldórsson
 Bang Gang - Find What You Get, directed by Árni Þór Jónsson
 70mínútur vs Quarashi - Crazy Bastard, directed by Sam&Gun
Best Television Personality
 Arnar Björnsson
 Arnar Gauti
 Auddi (Auðunn Blöndal)
 Birta (Þóra Sigurðardóttir)
 Bjarni Þór Grétarsson
 Brynhildur Ólafsdóttir
 Brynja Þorgeirsdóttir
 Bubbi Morthens
 Edda Andrésdóttir
 Egill Helgason
 Elín Hirst
 Elín María Björnsdóttir
 Eva María Jónsdóttir
 Eyrún Magnúsdóttir
 Felix Bergsson
 Gísli Einarsson
 Guðjón Guðmundsson
 Guðmundur Steingrímsson
 Guðni Bergsson
 Hálfdán Steinþórsson
 Heiðar Jónsson
 Heimir Karlsson
 Hemmi Gunn (Hermann Gunnarsson)
 Hörður Magnússon
 Inga Lind Karlsdóttir
 Jóhanna Vigdís Hjaltadóttir
 Jóhanna Vilhjálmsdóttir
 Jói (Jóhannes Ásbjörnsson)
 Jón Ársæll Þórðarsson
 Jónatan Garðarsson
 Kristján Kristjánsson
 Magga Stína
 Margrét Sigfúsdóttir
 Nadia Banine
 Ómar Ragnarsson
 Páll Magnússon
 Pétur Jóhann Sigfússon
 Ragnhildur Steinunn Jónsdóttir
 Reynir Hjálmarsson
 Siggi Stormur (Sigurður Ragnarsson)
 Sigmar Guðmundsson
 Silvía Nótt
 Simmi (Sigmar Vilhjálmsson)
 Sirrý (Sigríður Arnardóttir)
 Svanhildur Hólm
 Svavar Örn Svavarsson
 Sveppi (Sverrir Þór Sverrisson)
 Valdimar Örn Flygenring
 Vala Matt (Valgerður Matthíasdóttur)
 Villi Naglbítur (Vilhelm Anton Jónsson)
 Þóra Tómasdóttir
 Þórhallur Gunnarsson
 Þórunn Högna
Landsbankinn Motivation Award
 Elvar Gunnarson and his shortfilm Hið ljúfa líf
Honorary Award

Vilhjálmur Hjálmarsson, a former politician on the board of education, for hiss efforts in creating the Icelandic film fund in 1978.

External links 
 Edda Awards official website
 Edda Awards 2005 Photo Gallery at mbl.is

References 

Edda Awards
2005 film awards